Robert Wartenberg (June 19, 1887 – November 16, 1956) was a clinical neurologist and professor.

Born in the then-Russian Empire, he attended university and established his career in Germany. As a Jew, he was fired from his position as the University of Freiburg's Clinical Department of Neurology during the Nazi regime. He immigrated to the US, settling in San Francisco and teaching at the University of California in San Francisco.

He authored more than 150 papers and four books and made many significant discoveries in the area of clinical signs of neurological conditions.  He continues to be commemorated by the American Academy of Neurology's annual Robert Wartenberg Lecture and by many eponyms in the field of neurology.

Early life and education 
Wartenberg was born in 1887 in Grodno, Belarus, then in the Russian Empire.

He studied at the Universities of Kiel, Munich, and Freiburg eventually graduating magna cum laude from the University of Rostock, Germany in 1919. He worked with Max Nonne in Hamburg and Otfrid Foerster in Breslau.

Wartenberg became a Travelling Fellow of the Rockefeller Foundation from 1925 to 1926, visiting the U.S., U.K., and France. During this time, he worked for Harvey Cushing in Boston.

Career 

Following his graduation, Wartenberg worked for a series of German universities. In the early 1930s, he became head of the neurological clinic and professor in neurology and psychiatry at the University of Freiburg. As a Jew, Wartenberg was persecuted by the Nazi regime. He was removed from the position at the University of Freiburg's Clinical Department of Neurology due to the Nazi Law for the Restoration of the Professional Civil Service. Wartenberg left Nazi Germany as a refugee in 1935 or 1936.

He settled in San Francisco and began working for the University of California in 1936. He was made clinical professor of neurology in 1952 and eventually became head of the Neurology Department.

Over his career, Wartenberg authored more than 150 papers and four books.  His first book, "Examination of Reflexes," was translated into at least six languages. He submitted his final book to his publisher two hours before his death.

Wartenberg helped found the American Academy of Neurology, and served on the editorial boards of Confina Neurologica and The Journal of Nervous and Mental Disease.

Among his colleagues, he was considered to be a harsh, detail-oriented reviewer of his peers' writing. One of his colleagues stated of him that "The perfectionist drive led him at times into trouble, for he became notorious as a trenchant and hypercritical reviewer whose strictures often caused serious offence. This was quite an unfortunate trait, for his verbal violence was really quite at variance with his warm and generous personality." The same colleague described him as an excellent teacher, an opinion shared by Wartenberg's students.

Wartenberg was an honorary member of neurological societies in Spain, Italy, Germany, Austria, Brazil, and Argentina. He also helped found the American Academy of Neurology. During his career, he served on dozens of medical school academic search committees. He also sat of the editorial boards of Confina Neurologica and The Journal of Nervous and Mental Disease.

The Journal of Nervous and Mental Disease published a festschrift in honor of his 65th birthday titled "Neurological Problems in the World of 1953," and the American Academy of Neurology (AAN) awards an annual Robert Wartenberg Lecture in Wartenberg's honor. According to the According to the AAN's website, "The Robert Wartenberg Lecture Award is awarded to a neurologist for excellence in clinically relevant research."

Discoveries

Although Wartenberg participated in the early development of encephalography and myelography, he tended to favor clinical examinations and most of his accomplishments involved the identification new reflexes and signs that could be used to diagnose neurological problems from clinical examination of a patient. These included such signs as:

 A way to diagnose neurological diseases, including Parkinson's disease, by observing how a patient swings their legs when seated on the examining table;
 The tendon palpation test, in which a lesion in a patient's lower motor neurons can be detected from the softness of their Achilles tendon when standing;
 The lid vibration test, in which detects early signs of facial palsy (or the final signs near the end of recover from it) from eyelid movement; and
 The accessory nerve test in which damage to a nerve along the trapezius is revealed by examining whether the patient's fingers hang lower on one side than the other when the patient is standing.

He was also the first person to identify Cheiralgia paresthetica, also known as handcuff neuropathy or as Wartenberg’s syndrome.

Eponyms

During his career, Wartenberg worked to replace eponymous neurological terms with more descriptive names. However, he is now commemorated with several eponyms.  These include Wartenberg's migratory sensory neuropathy, Wartenberg's sign, Wartenberg’s syndrome, and the Wartenberg wheel. Wartenberg is sometimes incorrectly credited as the inventor of the Wartenberg wheel.. According to Wartenberg, this device, used to test skin sensitivity, was in widespread use in Europe when he lived in Germany. While he did not invent it, he found it "an indispensable part of the outfit for everyday neurologic practice," and recommended its use to his colleagues in the US.

Personal life

Wartenberg was born June 19, 1887.

In 1929, he married Baroness Isabelle von Sazenhofen. After establishing his career in Germany, he left due to persecution by the Nazi regime and reestablished his career in San Francisco, California, USA.

He eventually retired in 1954, to the status of emeritus professor of neurology.

Following a period of poor health in his final years, Wartenberg died of a "heart ailment" at Herbert C. Moffitt Hospital on Nov. 16, 1956 at age 69. He was survived by his wife and his father-in-law, Baron Karl von Sazenhofen, with whom he lived.

Selected publications

See also 
 Wartenberg's disease (syn.: Cheiralgia paresthetica): A sensitive neuropathy involving the superficial branch of the radial nerve.
 Wartenberg's sign: In ulnar paralysis the little finger is in a position of abduction.
 Wartenberg's syndrome: Radial nerve entrapment at the forearm.
 Wartenberg wheel: A medical device for neurological use.
 Wartenberg's migratory sensory neuropathy: A benign, relapsing and remitting condition involving pain, numbness and paresthesias in the sensory and peripheral nerves.

References

1880s births
1956 deaths
University of California faculty
University of Rostock alumni
People from Grodno
Emigrants from the Russian Empire to Germany
German emigrants to the United States
American neurologists
American people of Belarusian-Jewish descent